Henry Fleming may refer to:

Politicians
Henry Fleming (MP) (1663–1713), English politician, Member of Parliament (MP) for St Germans 1690–1698 and 1700–1708
Henry Fleming (Northern Ireland politician) (1870s–1956), member of the Senate of Northern Ireland

Fictional characters
Henry Fleming, main character in the novel The Red Badge of Courage (1895), by Stephen Crane 
Henry Fleming, character in ...And Justice for All (film)

See also
Harry Raymond Fleming, physician and politician